Albrecht Aschoff (11 September 1899 – 11 August 1972) was a German officer of the Imperial German Army, the Reichswehr and the Wehrmacht, jurist and politician of the Free Democratic Party (FDP) as well as former member of the German Bundestag.

Life 
Aschoff was the son of Sanitätsrat Prof. Dr. med. Albert Aschoff (1868–1945). At the end of WWII, Oberst Dr. jur. Aschoff was taken prisoner with the 16th Panzer Division by the Russians and finally returned home in 1955.

He was a member of the German Bundestag from 17 October 1961 to 17 October 1965 (one legislative period). He was elected via the FDP state list in North Rhine-Westphalia. From 1961 to 1963 he was a delegate of the Bundestag in the European Parliament. In addition, he had been Chairman of the Bundestag's Economic Committee since 9 January 1963.

Literature

References

1899 births
1972 deaths
Members of the Bundestag for North Rhine-Westphalia
Members of the Bundestag 1961–1965
Members of the Bundestag for the Free Democratic Party (Germany)
Free Democratic Party (Germany) MEPs
MEPs for Germany 1958–1979